Yet Another Perl Conference (YAPC), from 2016–2019 called The Perl Conference (TPC), from 2020 on The Perl and Raku Conference, is a series of conferences discussing the Perl programming language, usually organized under the auspices of The Perl Foundation and Yet Another Society, a "non-profit corporation for the advancement of collaborative efforts in computer and information sciences".  The name is an homage to yacc, "Yet Another Compiler Compiler".

The first YAPC was held at Carnegie Mellon University in Pittsburgh, Pennsylvania, US on June 24 and June 25, 1999.  Organizer Kevin Lenzo assembled 31 different speakers into the schedule on various Perl-related topics.  The idea of a low-cost Perl conference quickly spread with a European version of YAPC established in 2000, Israel in 2003, Australia in 2004, Asia and Brazil in 2005, and Russia in 2008.  The only continents never to have hosted a YAPC are Africa and Antarctica.

In 2016, YAPC rebranded itself as The Perl Conference, which is the former name of O'Reilly Open Source Convention (OSCON). As of 2020, it is now calling itself The Perl and Raku Conference to reflect the renaming of Perl 6 to Raku.

Locations

North America
 1999: Pittsburgh, Pennsylvania, USA (June 24 – June 25, 1999) YAPC::NA 1999
 2000: Pittsburgh, Pennsylvania, USA (June 21 – June 23, 2000) YAPC::NA 19100
 2001: Montréal, Québec, Canada (June 13 – June 15, 2001) YAPC::NA 2001
 2002: Saint Louis, Missouri, USA (June 26 – June 28, 2002) YAPC::NA 2002
 2003: Canada: Ottawa, Ontario, Canada (May 15 – May 16, 2003) (held as YAPC::Canada) YAPC::Canada
 2003: America: Boca Raton, Florida, USA (June 16 – June 18, 2003) YAPC::NA 2003
 2004: Buffalo, New York, USA (June 16 – June 18, 2004) YAPC::NA 2004
 2005: Toronto, Ontario, Canada (June 27 – June 29, 2005) YAPC::NA 2005
 2006: Chicago, Illinois, USA (June 26 – June 30, 2006) 2006) YAPC::NA 2006
 2007: Houston, Texas, USA (June 25 – June 27, 2007) YAPC::NA 2007
 2008: Chicago, Illinois, USA (June 16 – June 18, 2008) YAPC::NA 2008
 2009: Pittsburgh, Pennsylvania, USA (June 22 – June 24, 2009) YAPC::NA 2009
 2010: Columbus, Ohio, USA (June 21 – June 23, 2010) YAPC::NA 2010
 2011: Asheville, North Carolina, USA (June 27 – June 30, 2011) YAPC::NA 2011
 2012: Madison, Wisconsin, USA (June 13 – June 15, 2012) YAPC::NA 2012
 2013: Austin, Texas, USA (June 3 – June 5, 2013) YAPC::NA 2013
 2014: Orlando, Florida, USA (June 23 – June 25, 2014) YAPC::NA 2014
 2015: Salt Lake City, Utah, USA (June 8 – June 10, 2015) YAPC::NA 2015
 2016: Orlando, Florida, USA (June 20 – June 22, 2016) YAPC::NA 2016
 2017: Alexandria, Virginia, USA (June 18 – June 23, 2017) The Perl Conference in DC
 2018: Salt Lake City, Utah, USA (June 17 – June 22, 2018) The Perl Conference in Salt Lake City
 2019: Pittsburgh, Pennsylvania, USA (June 16 – June 21, 2019) The Perl Conference in Pittsburgh
 2020: Online (due to COVID-19) (Wednesday 24th to Friday 26th 2020) Perl and Raku 'Conference in the Cloud'
 Replaces TPCiH 2020 Houston Tuesday, planned June 23rd through Saturday, June 27th
 2022: The Hilton Houston North, USA (June 22rd through June 24th) TPCiH 2022 Houston

Europe
 2000: London, England (September 22-September 24, 2000) YAPC::EU 2000
 2001: Amsterdam, Netherlands (August 2-August 4, 2001) YAPC::EU 2001
 2002: Munich, Germany (September 18-September 20, 2002) YAPC::EU 2002
 2003: Paris, France (July 23-July 25, 2003) YAPC::EU 2003
 2004: Belfast, Northern Ireland (September 15-September 17, 2004) YAPC::EU 2004
 2005: Braga, Portugal (August 31-September 2, 2005) YAPC::EU 2005 Perl Everywhere
 2006: Birmingham, England (August 30-September 1, 2006) YAPC::EU 2006
 2007: Vienna, Austria (August 28–30, 2007) YAPC::EU 2007 Social Perl
 2008: Copenhagen, Denmark (August 13–15, 2008) YAPC::EU 2008 Beautiful Perl
 2009: Lisbon, Portugal (August 3–5, 2009) YAPC::EU 2009 Corporate Perl
 2010: Pisa, Italy (August 4–6, 2010) YAPC::EU 2010 The Renaissance of Perl
 2011: Riga, Latvia (August 15–17, 2011) YAPC::EU 2011 Modern Perl
 2012: Frankfurt, Germany (August 20–22, 2012) YAPC::EU 2012
 2013: Kyiv, Ukraine (August 12–14, 2013) YAPC::EU 2013 Future Perl
 2014: Sofia, Bulgaria (August 22–24, 2014) YAPC::EU 2014
 2015: Granada, Spain (September 2–4, 2015) YAPC::EU 2015 Art+Engineering
 2016: Cluj-Napoca, Romania (August 24–26, 2016) YAPC::Europe 2016
 2017: Amsterdam, the Netherlands (August 9–11, 2017) The Perl Conference in Amsterdam
 2018: Glasgow (August 13–17, 2018) The Perl Conference in Glasgow
 2019: Riga (August 7–9, 2019) PerlCon
 2020: Amsterdam (August 10-14 2020) Perl & Raku Con in Amsterdam - cancelled due to the Coronavirus pandemic

Israel
 2003: Haifa (May 11, 2003) YAPC::Israel::2003
 2004: Herzliya (February 26, 2004) YAPC::Israel::2004
 2005: Herzliya (February 17, 2005) YAPC::Israel::2005
 2006: Netanya. In 2006, YAPC::Israel became OSDC::Israel. OSDC::Israel 2006

Russia & Ukraine
 2008: Moscow, Russia (May 17–18, 2008) YAPC::Russia 2008 May Perl
 2009: Moscow, Russia (May 16–17, 2009) YAPC::Russia 2009 May Perl 2
 2010: Kyiv, Ukraine (June 12–14, 2010) YAPC::Russia 2010 May Perl + Perl Mova
 2011: Moscow, Russia (May 14–15, 2011) YAPC::Russia 2011 May Perl + Perl Mova
 2012: Kyiv, Ukraine (May 12–13, 2012) YAPC::Russia May Perl
 no event held in 2013, due to YAPC::Europe 2013 taking place in Kyiv
 2014: St. Petersburg, Russia (June 13–14, 2014) YAPC::Russia 2014
 2015: Moscow, Russia (May 16–17, 2015) YAPC::Russia 2015
 2017: Moscow, Russia (November 4, 2016) YAPC::Russia 2017

Australia
 The first YAPC::Australia was held as part of the 2004 OSDC in Melbourne from December 1-December 5, 2004, and has been held jointly thereafter.

South America
These events are held in conjunction with CONISLI.
 2006: Porto Alegre/RS (April 19-April 22, 2006) YAPC::SA::2006
 2007: Porto Alegre/RS (April 11-April 14, 2007) YAPC::SA::2007
 2008: Porto Alegre/RS (April 17-April 19, 2008) YAPC::SA::2008
 2009: Porto Alegre/RS (June 24-June 27, 2009) YAPC::SA::2009

Brazil
 2005: Porto Alegre/RS (June 1-June 5, 2005) YAPC::Brasil 2005
 2006: São Paulo/SP, Brazil (November 3-November 5, 2006) YAPC::Brasil 2006
 2007: São Paulo/SP, Brazil (November 9-November 11, 2007) YAPC::Brasil 2007
 2008: São Paulo/SP, Brazil (October 18-October 19, 2008) YAPC::Brasil 2008
 2009: Niterói/RJ, Brazil (October 30-November 1, 2009) YAPC::Brasil 2009
 2010: Fortaleza/CE, Brazil (October 25-October 31, 2010) YAPC::Brasil 2010 Perl: Solução e Integração de Negócios
 2011: Rio de Janeiro/RJ, Brazil (November 4-November 6, 2011) YAPC::Brasil 2011
 2012: São Paulo/SP, Brazil (October 19-October 20, 2012) YAPC::Brasil 2012 A revolução dos dados
 2013: Curitiba/PR, Brazil (November 15-November 16, 2013) YAPC::Brasil 2013 Universo Científico e Perl Hacking
 2014: Itapema/SC, Brazil (September 19-September 20, 2014) YAPC::Brasil 2014 Soluções Tecnológicas para Gestão Pública
 2015: Taubaté/SP, Brazil (September 18-September 20, 2015) YAPC::Brasil 2015 Perl Community and CPAN

Asia
 2004: Taipei, Taiwan (March 27-March 28, 2004) YAPC::2004::Taipei
 2005: Taipei, Taiwan (March 26-March 27, 2005) (held as YAPC::Taipei) YAPC::2005::Taipei
 2006: Tokyo, Japan (March 29-March 30, 2006) YAPC::Asia 2006
 2007: Tokyo, Japan (April 4-April 5, 2007) YAPC::Asia 2007
 2008: Tokyo, Japan (May 15-May 16, 2008) YAPC::Asia 2008
 2009: Tokyo, Japan (September 10-September 11, 2009) YAPC::Asia 2009
 2010: Tokyo, Japan (October 15-October 16, 2010) YAPC::Asia 2010
 2011: Tokyo, Japan (October 14-October 15, 2011) YAPC::Asia 2011
 2012: Tokyo, Japan (September 27-September 29, 2012) YAPC::Asia 2012
 2013: Tokyo, Japan (September 19-September 21, 2013) YAPC::Asia 2013
 2014: Tokyo, Japan (August 28-August 30, 2014) YAPC::Asia 2014
 2015: Tokyo, Japan (August 20-August 22, 2015) YAPC::Asia 2015
 2016: Hokkaido, Japan (09-10 December 2016) YAPC::Hokkaido
 2017: Kansai (3-4 March 2017) YAPC::Kansai 2017
 2017: Fukuoka (30th June - 1st July) YAPC::Fukuoka 2017
 2018: Okinawa (2-3 March 2018)YAPC::Okinawa 2018
 2019: Tokyo, Japan (25-26 January 2019) YAPC::Tokyo 2019
 2020: Kyoto, Japan (March 27 - 28 2020) YAPC::Kyoto 2020

External links
 YAPC Official Site
 YAPC::Europe Foundation
 YAPC::Russia
 YAPC Conference Surveys
 YAPC::Asia

Free-software conferences
Perl